Cristian Martín Palacios Ferreira (born September 2, 1990, in Salto, Uruguay), known as Cristian Palacios, is a Uruguayan footballer currently playing for the Chilean club Universidad de Chile

Titles
 Peñarol 2009-2010 (Uruguayan Primera División Championship)

Notes

References

External links
 
 

1990 births
Living people
Uruguayan footballers
Uruguayan expatriate footballers
Central Español players
Peñarol players
Atlético Tucumán footballers
El Tanque Sisley players
C.D. Olmedo footballers
Juventud de Las Piedras players
Club Atlético Temperley footballers
Montevideo Wanderers F.C. players
Club Puebla players
Liga MX players
Sporting Cristal footballers
Unión Española footballers
Peruvian Primera División players
Uruguayan Primera División players
Ecuadorian Serie A players
Argentine Primera División players
Chilean Primera División players
Expatriate footballers in Argentina
Expatriate footballers in Ecuador
Expatriate footballers in Mexico
Expatriate footballers in Chile
Uruguayan expatriate sportspeople in Argentina
Uruguayan expatriate sportspeople in Ecuador
Uruguayan expatriate sportspeople in Mexico
Uruguayan expatriate sportspeople in Chile
Association football forwards